Roger Roberts Avary (born August 23, 1965) is a Canadian-American  film and television director, screenwriter, and producer. He collaborated with Quentin Tarantino on Pulp Fiction, for which they won Best Original Screenplay at the 67th Academy Awards. Avary directed Killing Zoe, The Rules of Attraction, Lucky Day, and wrote the screenplays for Silent Hill and Beowulf.

In 2022, Avary reunited with Quentin Tarantino to launch a podcast called The Video Archives Podcast. The first episode premiered on July 19, 2022.

Career

Pulp Fiction
Avary and Quentin Tarantino worked on the 1994 film Pulp Fiction, for which they won the Academy Award for Best Original Screenplay. According to Tarantino, Avary originally came up with the plot of the boxer Butch Coolidge and his gold watch from a screenplay named Pandemonium Reigns he had written himself.

The Rules of Attraction
In 2002, Avary directed the film adaptation for The Rules of Attraction, based on Bret Easton Ellis' novel, which he also executive produced. The Rules of Attraction was the first studio film to be edited on Apple's Final Cut Pro editing system. Avary became a spokesperson for Final Cut Pro product, appearing in Apple print and web ads worldwide. In 2005, Avary, at the request of his friend, actor James Van Der Beek, played the part of a peyote-taking gonzo film director Franklin Brauner in the film Standing Still.

Silent Hill
In 2006, Avary wrote a screenplay adaptation to the Konami video game, Silent Hill (2006), with French director and friend, Christophe Gans, and Killing Zoe producer Samuel Hadida. Avary and Gans being long time gamers and fans of the Silent Hill series, collaborated on the film.

Beowulf
Avary and novelist Neil Gaiman wrote the screenplay for the 2007 film Beowulf which was directed by Robert Zemeckis.

Lucky Day
In September 2017 Avary directed his own screenplay, Lucky Day, a semi-sequel of Killing Zoe.

The Video Archives Podcast (2022–present)

In 2021, Quentin Tarantino announced that he and Roger Avary would launch a podcast titled The Video Archives Podcast. The point of the podcast is to discuss films from the actual Video Archives collection that they would recommend to customers when they worked there. The set is surrounded by actual VHS copies of films from Video Archives that Tarantino bought after the store went out of business. They are joined by podcast announcer, Gala Avary, Roger Avary's daughter. The first episode premiered on July 19, 2022. The duo discussed John Carpenter's Dark Star (1974) and Ulli Lommel's Cocaine Cowboys (1979).

Manslaughter charge
On January 13, 2008, Avary was arrested under suspicion of manslaughter and DUI, following a car crash in Ojai, California, where a passenger, Andreas Zini, was killed. The Ventura County Sheriff's department responded to the crash after midnight Sunday morning on the 1900 block of East Ojai Avenue. Avary was released from jail on $50,000 bail. In December 2008, he was charged with, and pleaded not guilty to, gross vehicular manslaughter and two felony counts of causing bodily injury while intoxicated. He changed his plea to guilty on August 18, 2009. On September 29, 2009, he was sentenced to one year in work furlough (allowing him to go to his job during the day and then report back to the furlough facility at night) and five years of probation. However, after making several tweets about the conditions of his stay on Twitter, Avary was sent to Ventura County Jail to serve out the remainder of his term.

In a 2012 interview with IndieWire, Avary said, regarding the crash and incarceration, "Incarceration didn't change me," and after a long pause, "In many, many ways, incarceration galvanized me. The totality of the experience helped me." He went on to say, "I spend every waking moment thinking about how I can live my life in such a way to honor this terrible loss that occurred."

In 2019, Avary said about the crash, "When something like that happens and an atom bomb sort of goes off in your life, it either blows you into pieces—if you allow it to—or you use the force of the blast to propel you forward."

Filmography

Film

Television

Short films

Other credits

References

External links

 
 
 
 Roger Avary talks to Edge Magazine about Silent Hill
 Roger Avary Interview on Suicide Girls
 Webwombat.com Interview
 Screen-It deconstructs the sex, drugs, and violence in The Rules of Attraction
 JoBlo.com Interview on Silent Hill

1965 births
21st-century Canadian criminals
Best Original Screenplay Academy Award winners
Best Original Screenplay BAFTA Award winners
Living people
People from Flin Flon
Film directors from Manitoba
20th-century Canadian screenwriters
Film producers from Manitoba
Writers from Manitoba
Canadian people convicted of manslaughter
21st-century American criminals
21st-century American male writers
21st-century Canadian male writers
20th-century American male writers
20th-century Canadian male writers
Canadian people of German descent
American people of German descent
21st-century Canadian screenwriters
Canadian male screenwriters